Dombrovsky, Dombrovskiy,  is a Russian form of  Polish surname. Notable people with the surname include:

 Vadim Dombrovskiy (born 1958), Soviet swimmer
 Yury Dombrovsky (1909–1978), Russian writer

See also
 Dąbrowski

Polish-language surnames